Descent into Limbo is a 1492 tempera and gold on panel painting by Andrea Mantegna, now in the Barbara Piasecka Johnson Collection in Princeton, New Jersey. It depicts the Descent into Limbo of Jesus Christ. There are also drawings of the subject by Mantegna in the École Supérieure des Beaux-Arts in Paris, whilst Giovanni Bellini also painted the subject.

Missing part 
Studies for the catalogue Accademia Carrara, Bergamo Dipinti Italiani del Trecento e del Quattrocento (edited by Giovanni Valagussa), included a painting owned by the Accademia Carrara (Bergamo) from 1866. It had formerly been considered to be a studio work, under the title Resurrection. During the studies it was re-identified as the upper part of Descent into Limbo, thanks to a small cross divided between the two parts.

References

Bibliography
 Tatjana Pauli, Mantegna, serie Art Book, Leonardo Arte, Milano 2001. 

Paintings by Andrea Mantegna
1492 paintings
Paintings of the Harrowing of Hell